Fabryka Słów (English: Factory of Words) is a Warsaw-based Polish publishing house. It was founded in Lublin in 2001 by Eryk Górski and Robert Łakuta who always wanted to publish good literature they liked reading themselves. It is focused on the fantasy and science fiction genres. Fabryka Słów also publishes historical novels and journalism for example Hubal by Jacek Komuda and Polactwo by Rafał Ziemkiewicz. It owns a number of popular series, most notably: Pan Lodowego Ogrodu, Achaja, Demonic Cycle, Seria o Przygodach Jakuba Wędrowycza, Inkwizytor Mordimer. Since 2013 they have been publishing a literary series of Fabryczna Zona (post-apocalyptic S.T.A.L.K.E.R universe)

The first book published by the Fabryka Słów was Kroniki Jakuba Wędrowycza by Andrzej Pilipiuk. So far there have been more than fifteen titles in this series. Other notable Polish authors who published in Fabryka Słów are: Andrzej Ziemiański, Eugeniusz Dębski, Jacek Komuda, Rafał A. Ziemkiewicz, Jarosław Grzędowicz, Maja Lidia Kossakowska, Jacek Piekara, Michał Gołkowski, Tomasz Kołodziejczak, Magdalena Kozak, Adam Przechrzta. Fabryka Słów publishes foreign authors too, for example: Peter V.Brett, Miroslav Żamboch, Angus Watson, Brian McClellan, Patricia Briggs and Ilona Andrews.

References 

Publishing companies of Poland
Polish companies established in 2002
Publishing companies established in 2002
Mass media in Lublin
Book publishing companies of Poland
Polish Limited Liability Companies